Lázaro Macapagal was a lieutenant colonel in the Philippine Revolution, known for being the executioner of Andrés Bonifacio and his brother Procopio Bonifacio in 1897 under the orders of Emilio Aguinaldo.

He is a direct descendant of Don Juan Macapagal, a prince and ecomendiero of Tondo, and an ancestor of Diosdado Macapagal, the 9th president of the Philippines and Gloria Macapagal Arroyo, the 14th President of the Philippines.

In popular culture
 Portrayed by Hero Bautista in the 2012 film, El Presidente.
 Portrayed by Mike Gayoso in the 2014 film, Bonifacio: Ang Unang Pangulo.

References

Filipino generals
People of the Philippine Revolution
Lazaro